The 2015 NBPA Players Awards was the inaugural presentation of the NBPA Players Awards. Organized and administered by the National Basketball Players Association, the awards presentation was presented on Sunday, 19 July 2015.  It was recorded for broadcast by BET Networks and an edited presentation was broadcast on Tuesday, 21 July 2015 at 8pm in the Eastern time zone by the BET and Centric cable networks. Both networks were controlled by BET Networks.

In addition to a number of NBA players, several entertainers appeared on the broadcast including Lil Wayne, 2 Chainz, Jason Derulo, Fifth Harmony, Monica, Kid Ink, DJ Khaled and comedian Gary Owen. The awards presentation was hosted by comedian Jay Pharoah of Saturday Night Live.

Methodology 
On 15 April 2015, Michèle Roberts, the Executive Director of the NBPA issued a statement announcing the categories and methodology by which players would be voted upon. Ms. Roberts pointed out that candidates were recommended in eight of ten categories with players having the option to write in a name in those eight categories.  The vote for MVP was a write-in vote.  Every active NBA player during the 2014-15 season voted privately by paper ballot which was sealed and submitted to the American Arbitration Association for tabulation before the end of the regular season.

In subsequent press releases, "top vote getters" were listed alphabetically.

Top Vote Getters and Winners

Best Rookie 
 Jordan Clarkson, Los Angeles Lakers
 Zach LaVine, Minnesota Timberwolves
 Elfrid Payton, Orlando Magic
 Andrew Wiggins, Minnesota Timberwolves

Best Defender 
 Tony Allen, Memphis Grizzlies
 Jimmy Butler, Chicago Bulls
 Anthony Davis, New Orleans Pelicans
 DeAndre Jordan, Los Angeles Clippers

Global Impact Player 
 Pau Gasol, Chicago Bulls
 Kyrie Irving, Cleveland Cavaliers
 Dirk Nowitzki, Dallas Mavericks
 Tony Parker, San Antonio Spurs

Clutch Performer 
 Stephen Curry, Golden State Warriors
 James Harden, Houston Rockets
 LeBron James, Cleveland Cavaliers
 Russell Westbrook, Oklahoma City Thunder

Coach You Most Want to Play For 
 Mike Budenholzer, Atlanta Hawks
 Rick Carlisle, Dallas Mavericks
 Steve Kerr, Golden State Warriors
 Gregg Popovich, San Antonio Spurs

Hardest to Guard 
 Stephen Curry, Golden State Warriors
 James Harden, Houston Rockets
 LeBron James, Cleveland Cavaliers
 Russell Westbrook, Oklahoma City Thunder

Best Home Court Advantage 
 AT&T Center, San Antonio Spurs
 Chesapeake Energy Arena, Oklahoma City Thunder
 Moda Center, Portland Trail Blazers
 Oracle Arena, Golden State Warriors

Player You Secretly Wish was On Your Team 
 Stephen Curry, Golden State Warriors
 Anthony Davis, New Orleans Pelicans
 Tim Duncan, San Antonio Spurs
 LeBron James, Cleveland Cavaliers

Most Valuable Player 
 Stephen Curry, Golden State Warriors
 James Harden, Houston Rockets
 LeBron James, Cleveland Cavaliers
 Russell Westbrook, Oklahoma City Thunder

Honorees 
In addition to the awards voted upon, three additional honorees were announced during the awards broadcast.

References

External links 
 

National Basketball Association lists
National Basketball Association awards